Sir Fredric Wise  (1871 – 26 January 1928) was a British politician who served as the Conservative and Unionist Member of Parliament for Ilford in Essex after winning the 1920 Ilford by-election. Wise served until his death in 1928, when he was succeeded in another by-election by George Hamilton.

Political career 
Wise ran for parliament in 1920 in a by-election, which was triggered after the death of the Coalition Unionist Member of Parliament Sir William Peter Griggs. He was elected with a majority of the votes cast.

Wise was re-elected in the general elections of 1922, 1923 and 1924.

Wise died in 1928.

Electoral history

1920 by-election

1922 general election

1923 general election

1924 general election

References 

1871 births
1928 deaths
Conservative Party (UK) MPs for English constituencies
UK MPs 1918–1922
UK MPs 1922–1923
UK MPs 1923–1924
UK MPs 1924–1929
People from Ilford